The 2015 USA Indoor Track and Field Championships was held at the Reggie Lewis Track and Athletic Center in Boston, Massachusetts. Organised by USA Track and Field (USATF), the three-day competition took place from February 27 to March 1 and served as the national championships in track and field for the United States.

It marked a return to the Reggie Lewis Track as host, after the Albuquerque Convention Center had hosted the four previous editions. The USA Indoor Combined Events Championships was held in conjunction, taking place in the first two days. All events in the first day were part of the combined events competitions. A total of thirty championship events were contested The championships was broadcast live on television in the United States via NBCSN and also broadcast live on the internet by the governing body's "USATF.TV".

As a result of it being a non-IAAF World Indoor Championships year, some non-standard track events were added to the programme. The traditional 400-meter dash and 800-meter run were replaced by a 300-meter dash and 600-meter run. The distance schedule was changed from the usual 1500-meter run and 3000-meter run to a 1000-meter run, mile run and two-mile run. The walks were also contested over a distance of two miles. New championship records were set in all these events, bar the women's two miles for which Lynn Jennings 1986 time (a former world record) remained. Casimir Loxsom's winning time of 1:15.33 minutes in the 1000 m was an American indoor record and Panamerican indoor record. Two championship records were set in the heats of these races: Robby Andrews ran a time of 2:19.85 minutes for the 1000 metres before winning the title, while Ajee' Wilson set a best of 1:26.56 minutes in the 600 m heats but finished last in the final.

Jeremy Taiwo set a championships record in the men's heptathlon with a total score of 6273 points. Reigning women's pentathlon champion Sharon Day-Monroe had her fourth straight win at the meet (a new high for the meet), but was slightly short of her record score of 2014. As a three-time winner of the heptathlon at the USA Outdoor Track and Field Championships, Day-Monroe's victory made her the most successful combined events athlete in American national championships history. Shannon Rowbury managed a double in the mile and two miles, being the only athlete to win twice at the event in Boston.

Three non-championship exhibition events were also part of the programme. A mixed-gender youth 4×200-meter relay between local teams was won by Metropolis Track Club. There were also two masters events: a men's 1500 m was won by John Trautmann in a time of 3:59.47 minutes, and  a women's 300 m won by Kathryn McManus in 42.27 seconds. The men's event also saw Anselm LeBourne break the over-55's indoor record with a run of 4:13.77 minutes.

Medal summary

Men

Women

References

Results
2015 USA Indoor Track and Field Championships Results. USA Track and Field. Retrieved on 2015-03-02, fixed on 2021-07-07.

External links
Official USATF website

2015
Track and field indoor
USA Indoor Track and Field Championships
USA Indoor Track and Field Championships
USA Indoor Track and Field Championships
Sports competitions in Boston
Track and field in Massachusetts